In computer science, an inversion list is a data structure that describes a set of non-overlapping numeric ranges, stored in increasing order.

The set is stored in an array.  Every other element is the first element of a range, and every other element is the first element after that range (a half-open range).

For example, for ranges 10-14, 25-37, the inversion list would be:

10 15 25 38

To search whether an item belongs to any of the ranges, a binary search is made.  If the search ends in a "first" element, the searched item is in the set.  If the search ends in an "after" element, or outside the array, the searched item is not in the set.

This data structure is used in many Unicode implementations for storing Unicode character ranges (like "Greek characters").

External links 
 Unicode Demystified (Google Books snippet, pages 504-)
 Unicode::UCD Perl module

Search algorithms